Festivus is a secular holiday occurring on December 23

Festivus may also refer to:
 The Festivus, a seashell periodical
 Festivus Film Festival, a former film festival in Denver

See also
 Festivus Maximus or Super Bowl XXXV
 "The Strike" (Seinfeld), the 1997 episode of Seinfeld that introduced the holiday